The Junction City Post is a news service based in Junction City, Kansas. Other local news media in the area use it as a resource.

External links
 Official web site

References

Newspapers published in Kansas